Kamila Rajdlová (born April 22, 1978, in Liberec) is a Czech cross-country skier who has competed since 1996. Her best finish at the FIS Nordic World Ski Championships was sixth in the 4 × 5 km relay at Oberstdorf in 2005 while her best individual finish was 11th in the 30 km event at Sapporo in 2007.

Rajdlová's best finish at the Winter Olympics was 23rd in the 7.5 km + 7.5 km double pursuit event at Vancouver in 2010.

Her best individual World Cup finish was 10th in a 10 km event in Estonia in 2007.

Cross-country skiing results
All results are sourced from the International Ski Federation (FIS).

Olympic Games

World Championships

a.  Cancelled due to extremely cold weather.

World Cup

Season standings

Team podiums

 1 podium – (1 )

References

External links
 

1978 births
Cross-country skiers at the 2002 Winter Olympics
Cross-country skiers at the 2006 Winter Olympics
Cross-country skiers at the 2010 Winter Olympics
Czech female cross-country skiers
Living people
Olympic cross-country skiers of the Czech Republic
Sportspeople from Liberec